Paul Davidson (born October 23, 1930) is an American macroeconomist who has been one of the leading spokesmen of the American branch of the post-Keynesian school in economics. He is a prolific writer and has actively intervened in important debates on economic policy (natural resources, international monetary system, developing countries' debt) from a position critical of mainstream economics.

Davidson identified the six key elements of Post Keynesian school as
 commitment to historical time
 uncertainty as the relevant background assumption for decision makers
 institutional determination of prices and wages
 the central relevance of distribution of income and wealth
 the requirement that real capital is malleable and reflects time-based experience
 that income effects dominate substitution effects

Early life
Davidson did not originally choose economics as a profession. His primary training was in both chemistry and biology, for which he received B.Sc. degrees from Brooklyn College in 1950. He was a graduate student in biochemistry at the University of Pennsylvania, but switched to economics, receiving his MBA from the City University of New York in 1955, and completing his PhD at the University of Pennsylvania in 1959.

J. Barkley Rosser Jr. from the Levy Economics Institute describes how, despite being accepted to graduate programs at Harvard, M.I.T., Berkeley and Brown, Davidson accepted an offer to the University of Pennsylvania which came with a generous financial aid package, which allowed him and his wife Louise, to start a family.

Professional Positions
During his seven decades as an economist, Davidson's professional positions included:

 Visiting Scholar, Schwartz Center For Economic Policy Analysis, New School 2004-2014
 Advisory Board, Institute for New Economic Thinking 2010-
 Holly Chair of Excellence in Political Economy, University of Tennessee 1986-2001
 Visiting Professor, University of Nice and Latapsis Research Institute (France) 1990
 Professor of Economics and associate director of the Bureau of Economic Research, Rutgers University 1966-1986
 Professor, International Summer School, Centro di Studi Economici Avanzati (Trieste) 1980-1992
 Visiting Professor, University of Strasbourg (France) 1986
 Visiting Professor, Institute for Advanced Studies (Vienna) 1980-84
 Co-Founding Editor, Journal of Post Keynesian Economics 1978-2014
 Chair, New Brunswick Department of Economics and Allied Sciences, Rutgers University 1975-1978
 Senior Visitor, University of Cambridge, Cambridge, England 1970-71
 Associate Professor of Economics, University of Pennsylvania 1963-1966
 Visiting Lecturer, University of Bristol, England 1964-65
 Assistant Professor, University of Pennsylvania 1961-63
 Assistant Director, Economics Division, Continental Oil Company (Conoco) 1960-61
 Assistant Professor, Rutgers University 1958-60 
 Instructor in Economics, University of Pennsylvania 1955-58 
 Instructor in Physiological Chemistry, University of Pennsylvania 1950-52

At Cambridge he worked with Joan Robinson to discuss draft chapters of his manuscript Money and the Real World .
 The discussions got very heated and she finally refused to speak to him about his work. Soon, when Davidson arrived at his office, he would often find a blank sheet of paper with a hand written question from her. He would spend the morning writing his answer and when Robinson went out for morning coffee, he would put the paper with his answer in her office. When Davidson returned to his office after lunch he would find Robinson's comments scrawled over the paper.

Davidson had a role in developing Environmental economics after his role as economic advisor to Continental Oil. Davidson was "nearly fired" when he forecast the company would do better if John F. Kennedy won the 1960 United States presidential election but when Kennedy won, though Davidson's counsel was  more sought after by management, he and his wife, tired of the corporate environment, left to return to academia.

Controversies
Paul Davidson warned of the impending subprime mortgage crisis in January 2008 and explicitly contested Alan Greenspan's recommendation for a market-based solution to let “housing prices (and security pegged to mortgages) fall until investors see them as bargains and start buying, stabilizing the economy,” instead accurately predicting that “if Congress does nothing, then a year from today we may be mired in the Greatest Recession since the Great Depression.” Ten months later when the economy collapsed, Greenspan admitted in Congressional testimony to be shocked that his free-market ideology was flawed.

Congressional appearances
Davidson has appeared before United States congressional subcommittees and provided testimony twenty times from 1973 to 1985 mostly on energy and antitrust issues.

Published Activity
Davidson has authored or co-authored 22 books including Who's Afraid of John Maynard Keynes? Challenging Economic Governance in an Age of Growing Inequality and hundreds of articles.

Davidson and Sidney Weintraub founded the Journal of Post Keynesian Economics in 1978. Davidson continued as editor of that journal until 2014. He is also a contributor to the Center for Full Employment and Stability. The CFEPS website (see Other Contributors: Paul Davidson ) contains more biographical information about him, as well as a list of his publications, with links to a few.

Edward Elgar Publishing published a three-volume "Essays in Honour of Paul Davidson" series starting in 1996. They include

References

Major publications

 
 
 Theories of Aggregate Income Distribution, 1960
 
 
 
 
 Aggregate Supply and Demand Analysis, with E. Smolensky, 1964
 
 
 
 "The Valuation of Public Goods," 1968, in Garnsey and Hibbs (eds.), Social Sciences and the Environment
 
 
 
 
 
 Money and the Real World, 1972
 
 "Market Disequilibrium Adjustments: Marshall Revisited," 1974, Econ Inquiry
 
 "Post-Keynesian Monetary Theory and Inflation", 1977, in S. Weintraub (ed.), Modern Economic Thought
 "A Discussion of Leijonhufvud's Social Consequences of Inflation", 1977, in Harcourt (ed.), Microfoundations of Macroeconomics
 "The Carter Energy Proposal", 1977, Challenge
 "Money and General Equilibrium," 1977, Economie Appliquee
 
 
 "Post Keynesian Approach to the Theory of Natural Resources", 1979, Challenge
 "Monetary Policy, Regulation and International Adjustments," with M.A. Miles, 1979, Economies et Societies
 
 "What Is the Energy Crisis?", 1979, Challenge
 "Keynes's Paradigm: A Theoretical Framework for Monetary Analysis", with J.A. Kregel, 1980, in Nell (ed.), Growth, Property and Profits
 
 "Keynes's Theory of Employment, Expectations and Indexing", 1980, Revista de Economia Latinoamericana
 "Post Keynesian Economics: Solving the Crisis in Economic Theory", 1981, in Bell and Kristol (eds.), The Crisis in Economic Theory
 
 "Alfred Marshall is Alive and Well in Post Keynesian Economics", 1981, IHS Journal
 "A Critical Analysis of the Monetarist-Rational Expectations Supply Side (Incentive) Economics Approach to Accumulation During a Period of Inflationary Expectations," 1981, Kredit und Kapital
 International Money and the Real World, 1982
 
 "Monetarism and Reagonomics", 1983, in S. Weintraub and Goodstein (eds.), Reagonomics in the Stagflation Economy
 
 
 
 
 "The Conventional Wisdom on Deficits Is Wrong", 1984, Challenge
 "Incomes Policy as a Social Institution", 1985, in Maital and Lipnowski (eds.), Macroeconomic Conflict and Social Institutions
 "Policies For Prices And Incomes", 1985, in Barrere (ed.), Keynes Today
 "Financial Markets and Williamson's Theory of Governance: Efficiency vs. Concentration vs. Power", with G.S. Davidson, 1984, Quarterly Review of Economics and Business
 
 
 
 "A Post Keynesian View of Theories and Causes of High Real Interest Rates", 1986, Thames Papers in Political Economy
 
 
 "Financial Markets, Investment, and Employment", 1988, in Matzner et al. (eds.), Barriers to Full Employment
 
 
 "Weitzman's Share Economy And The Aggregate Supply Function", 1988, in Hamouda and Smithin (eds.), Keynes and Public Policy After Fifty Years
 "Endogenous Money, The Production Process, And Inflation Analysis", 1988, Economie Appliquee
 "A Technical Definition of Uncertainty and the Long Run Non- Neutrality of Money", 1988, Cambridge JE
 Economics for a Civilized Society, with G. Davidson, 1988
 "Keynes and Money" 1989, in Hill (ed.), Keynes, Money, and Monetarism
 "Prices and Income Policy: An Essay in Honor of Sidney Weintraub", 1989, in Barrere (ed.), Money, Credit, and Prices in Keynesian Perspective
 "Patinkin's Interpretation of Keynes and the Keynesian Cross", 1989, HOPE
 
 "The Economics of Ignorance Or Ignorance of Economics?", 1989, Critical Review
 "Shackle and Keynes vs. Rational Expectations Theory on the Role of Time, Liquidity, and Financial Markets" 1990, in S. Frowen (ed.), Unknowledge and Choice in Economics
 "Liquidity Proposals for a New Bretton Woods Plan", 1990, in Barrere, Keynesian Economic Policies
 "On Thirlwall's Law", 1990, Revista de Economia Politica
 Collected Writings of Paul Davidson (2 vols.), 1990–1.
 Controversies in Post Keynesian Economics, 1991
 
 "Is Probability Theory Relevant For Choice Under Uncertainty?: A Post Keynesian Perspective", 1991, JEP
 "What Kind of International Payments System Would Keynes Have Recommended for the Twenty-First Century?" 1991, in Davidson and Kregel (eds.), Economic Problems of the 1990s
 "Money: Cause or Effect? Exogenous or Endogenous?", 1992, in Nell and Semmler (eds.), Nicholas Kaldor and Mainstream Economics
 "Eichner's Approach to Money and Macroeconomics", 1992, in Milberg (ed.), The Megacorp and Macrodynamics
 
 
 
 "Asset Deflation and Financial Fragility" 1993, in Arestis (ed.), Contemporary Issues in Money and Banking
 Can the Free Market Pick Winners? (editor), 1993
 Growth, Employment and Finance: Economic Reality and Economic Theory, (co-edited with J.A. Kregel), 1994
 "The Asimakopulos View of Keynes's General Theory", 1994, in Harcourt and Roncaglia (eds.), Investment and Employment in Theory and Practice
 "Monetary Theory and Policy In A Global Context With A Large International Debt" 1994, in Frowen (ed.), Monetary Theory and Monetary Policy
 Post Keynesian Macroeconomic Theory: a foundation for successful economic policies for the Twenty-first Century, 1994
 Economics For A Civilized Society, with Greg Davidson, 1996.
 "What Are The Essential Characteristics of Post Keynesian Monetary Theory?", 1996, in G. Deleplace and E. J. Nell (eds.), Money in Motion
 "The General Theory in An Open Economy," 1996, in Harcourt and Riach (eds.), A Second Edition of the General Theory
 
 
 
 "Is a Plumber Or A Financial Architect Needed to End Global International Liquidity Problems?", 2000, World Development
 Financial Markets, Money and the Real World, 2002
 
 
 
 "The Post Keynesian School", Snowden and Vane (eds.) Modern Macroeconomics, 2005
 
 
 "Can, Or Should, A Central Bank Inflation Target?" 2006, JPKE
 "Keynes and Money" in Arestis and Sawyer (eds.) Handbook of Alternative Monetary Economics, 2006
 "Keynes, Post Keynesian Analysis, and the Open Economies of the Twenty-first Century" Arestis, McCombie and Vickerman (eds.) Growth and Economic Development, 2006
 "Are We Making Progress Towards A Civilized Society?", 2007, JPKE
 John Maynard Keynes, 2007
 "How To Solve The U.S. Housing Problem and Avoid A Recession: A Revived HOLC and FTC", Schwartz Center For Economic Policy Analysis: Policy Note, 2008.
 "Securitization, Liquidity, and Market Failure", 2008, Challenge
 "Is The Current Financial Distress Caused By The Sub Prime Mortgage Crisis A Minsky moment? Or Is It The Result of Attempting To Securitize Illiquid Non Commercial Mortgage Loans?", 2008, JPKE
 The Keynes Solution: The Path to Global Economic Prosperity, 2009
 
  Pdf.

External links

 Paul Davidson video interviews and presentations
 Paul Davidson books in print

1930 births
Living people
People from Brooklyn
Post-Keynesian economists
Economic historians
Institute for New Economic Thinking
Brooklyn College alumni